Pressure Chief is the fifth studio album by American band Cake. It was released on October 5, 2004, pushed back from its original August release date. It was produced by the band and recorded in a converted house in Sacramento. The lead single, "No Phone" peaked at #13 on the U.S. Billboard Modern Rock Tracks chart. The second single "Carbon Monoxide" garnered some airplay but failed to crack the Modern Rock Tracks top 40. The album was the band's second and last record under Columbia Records.

The songs "She'll Hang the Baskets" and "Tougher Than It Is" were both originally written for Cake's 1998 record Prolonging the Magic. A bonus disc, Extra Value, was included in limited pre-orders of Pressure Chief.

On its opening week, Pressure Chief sold about 46,000 copies, debuting and peaking at number 17 on the Billboard 200. However, it fell to #55 the following week. By the next month, the album had only sold 91,478 copies.

Critical reception
Pressure Chief was met with "mixed or average" reviews from critics. At Metacritic, which assigns a weighted average rating out of 100 to reviews from mainstream publications, this release received an average score of 52 based on 8 reviews.

In a review for AllMusic, Johnny Loftus wrote: "Pressure Chief marks Cake's tenth year with a set of sardonic, engaging alternative pop that shows the Sacramento band's economical sound unwilted after all these years." Matt Weir of Tiny Mix Tapes gave a three-and-a-half stars out of five, calling the release the "weakest effort" by the band."

Track listing

Personnel
Cake
John McCrea – acoustic guitar, keyboard, percussion, lead vocals, cover design
Vince DiFiore – trumpet, melodica, keyboard, percussion, background vocals
Xan McCurdy – electric and acoustic guitar, bass, drums, keyboard, background vocals
Gabe Nelson – bass, keyboard, drums, electric and acoustic guitar, background vocals

Additional musicians
Tyler Pope – additional keyboard, percussion and guitar (on "No Phone", "Dime", "The Guitar Man", and "Palm Of Your Hand")
Chuck Prophet – electric guitar (on "She'll Hang The Baskets")
Paulo Baldi – drums (on "No Phone", and "Carbon Monoxide")
Matt McCord – drums (on "The Guitar Man")
Todd Roper – drums on (on "She'll Hang The Baskets", and "Tougher Than It Is")
Greg Vincent – pedal steel guitar (on "She'll Hang The Baskets", and "Palm Of Your Hand")

Additional personnel
Cake – Arranger, Producer, Engineer, Mixing
Craig Long – Engineer, Mixing
Mark Needham – Engineer, Mixing
Patrick Olguin – Engineer, Mixing
Kirt Shearer – Engineer, Mixing
Don C. Tyler – Mastering

Charts

Singles – Billboard (United States)

Television performances
"No Phone" on The Tonight Show with Jay Leno on Monday, October 4, 2004
"Wheels" on Jimmy Kimmel Live!
"No Phone" on The Late Late Show (with guest host Tom Arnold) on Tuesday, October 5, 2004

Appearances in other media 
 The song "Wheels" is featured in the soundtrack of the film I Love You, Man.

References

External links
 
 Pressure Chief on Last.fm
 

2004 albums
Cake (band) albums
Columbia Records albums